The Apollo 11 Cave is an archeological site in the ǁKaras Region of south-western Namibia, approximately  southwest of Keetmanshoop. The name given to the surrounding area and presumably the cave by the Nama people was "Goachanas". However, the cave was given its name by German archaeologist Wolfgang Erich Wendt in reference to Apollo 11's then recent return to Earth.

Overview
The cave contained some of the oldest pieces of mobile art ever discovered in southern Africa, associated with charcoal that was radiocarbon dated from 27,500 to 25,500 BP. The art slabs found in this cave are referred to as the Apollo 11 Stones. In total, seven grey-brown quartzite slabs were excavated from the cave. 

Besides the slabs, the cave contained several white and red paintings. The subject of paintings ranged from simple geometric patterns to bees, which are still a nuisance to the unwary traveler.

The engravings consisted of depictions of animals as well as simple geometric patterns. 

It is hard to pinpoint dates of the engravings and paintings, but the paintings may belong to period as far back as 10,400 BP and the engravings may come from early settlers in the first millennium AD. These dates come from Wendt's stratigraphic record of the site as well as evidence from other sites in the surrounding area.

More recent finds include two rib pieces (one with 26 notches; the
other with 12 notches) dated to 80,000 BP.

See also
 Caves of Namibia
 Upper Paleolithic
 Late Stone Age

References

Further reading 
 John C. Vogel: Suitability of Ostrich eggshell for radiocarbon dating. Radiocarbon, Bd. 43 (1), S. 133–137.
 Tilman Lenssen-Erz, Marie-Theres Erz, Gerhard Bosinski (Hrsg): Brandberg. Der Bilderberg Namibias, Kunst und Geschichte einer Urlandschaft. Jan Thorbecke Verlag, Stuttgart 2000, 3-7995-9030-7, S. 89.
 Ralf Vogelsang: The Rock-Shelter „Apollo 11“ – Evidence of Early Modern Humans in South-Western Namibia. In: Megan Biesele, Cornelia Limpricht (Hrsg.): Heritage and Cultures in Modern Namibia: In-depth Views of the Country. TUCSIN-Festschrift, Klaus Hess Verlag, Windhoek Göttingen 2008, S. 183–193.
 Ralf Vogelsang et al.: New Excavations of Middle Stone Age Deposits at Apollo 11 Rockshelter, Namibia: Stratigraphy, Archaeology, Chronology and Past Environments. Journal of African Archaeology 8 (2) 2010, pp. 185-218.

External links 
 Apollo 11 Cave (Namibia) c. 28,000 BP
 The Metropolitan Museum of Art
 The South African Archaeological Bulletin
 Gardner's Art Through the Ages

Caves of Namibia
Geology of Namibia
ǁKaras Region
Archaeological sites in Namibia
Archaeological sites of Southern Africa